The 1987–88 season was the 108th season of competitive football by Rangers.

Overview
Rangers played a total of 58 competitive matches during the 1987–88 season. The team finished a disappointing third in the Scottish Premier Division with 60 points, two behind Hearts and twelve behind champions Celtic.

Future club captain Richard Gough was signed from Tottenham Hotspur for a club record fee of £1.1m.

In the cup competitions, they were knocked out of the Scottish Cup in the fourth round, losing 2–0 away to Dunfermline Athletic. They won the League Cup (Skol Cup), defeating Aberdeen 5–3 on penalties after the match was drawn 3–3.

The European campaign was fairly successful. The club reached the quarter final of the European Cup after beating Dynamo Kiev and Górnik Zabrze before being knocked out by Steaua Bucharest.

Rangers defeated English Champions Everton in the Dubai Super Cup in December. The match ended 2–2 with Rangers winning the penalty shootout 8–7. The match was dubbed the unofficial British Championship decider by the football media.

Transfer

In

Out

Results
All results are written with Rangers' score first.

Scottish Premier Division

European Cup

Scottish Cup

League Cup

*Rangers won the match 5–3 on penalties

Dubai Super Cup

*Rangers won the match 8–7 on penalties

Glasgow Cup

✝Competition not completed

Appearances

League table

See also
 1987–88 in Scottish football
 1987–88 Scottish Cup
 1987–88 Scottish League Cup
 1987–88 UEFA Cup

References 

Rangers F.C. seasons
Rangers